Ann Pennington may refer to:

Ann Pennington (actress) (1893–1971), popular stage star of the 1910s and 1920s
Ann Pennington (model) (born 1950), model who posed for Playboy
Anne Pennington (1934–1981), British philologist